The list of Axis named operations in the European Theatre represents those military operations that received a codename, predominantly from the Wehrmacht commands. It does not represent all operations that were carried out by the Axis powers, or their allies in the European Theatre during the Second World War. Although named operations, the entries represent activities that spanned the entire theatre or large parts of it, multi-year campaigns, battles, engagements and even combat that resulted in relatively small actions by armed forces.

Pre-war operations 
 Fall Blau 1935 - German defence planning on the eastern border, simultaneously with Fall Rot
 Fall Rot 1935 - German defence planning on the western border, simultaneously with Fall Blau
 Operation Feuerzauber 1936–1939 - German transfer of weapons and personnel to Francisco Franco's forces in the Spanish Civil War
 Operation Ursula 1936–1939 - German submarine operation in support of Francisco Franco's naval forces during the Spanish Civil War
 Operation Bodden 1937–1943 - German Abwehr intelligence gathering system in Spain and Morocco
 Fall Richard 1937 - German contingency planning for Soviet takeover of Spain
 Fall Rot 1937 - German planned invasion of France
 Operation Rügen 1937 - German bombing of Guernica, Spain
 Fall Blau 1938 - German air force research; later renamed Planstudie 39
 Fall Grün 1938 - German plan for invasion of Czechoslovakia
 Operation Otto 1938 - German plan for the annexation of Austria

1939 
 Operation A-Bewegung 1939 - German preparation for the invasion of Poland; part of Fall Weiss
 Operation Dirschau 1939 - German operation to safeguard the rail bridge at Tczew (German: Dirschau), Poland during the invasion
 Operation Himmler 1939 - German staged attacks in Poland to justify invasion; part of Fall Weiss
 Operation Nordwest 1939 - German study for a potential invasion of Britain; parts of Operation Nordwest were integrated into Operation Seelöwe
 Operation Ost 1939 - German operation in Southern Poland near the border with Czechoslovakia
 Plan Z 1939 - German plan to expand the Kriegsmarine to match the strength of the British Royal Navy
 Planstudie 39 1939 - German air force research
 Fall Weiss 1939 - German invasion of Poland. German bombing of Wieluń, Poland; part of Fall Weiss
 Fall Rot 1939 - German planned invasion of France
 Operation Sonderaktion Krakau 1939 - German operation to murder members of the intelligentsia at universities in Kraków, Poland
 Operation Tannenberg 1939 - German plan to exterminate Polish intelligentsia
 Operation Wasserkante 1939 - German aerial bombing of Warsaw, Poland
 Operation Blitzableiter 1939–1945 - German bacteriological weapons research

1940 
 Operation Mittelmeer 1940–1941 - German reinforcement of the Italian Regia Aeronautica in the Mediterranean
 Operation Juno 1940 - German naval operation against British warships off Narvik, Norway
 Operation Weserübung 1940 - German invasion of Denmark and Norway
 Operation Weserübung Nord 1940 - German attack on Trondheim and Narvik, Norway; part of Operation Weserübung
 Operation Weserübung Sud 1940 - German attack on Bergen, Kristiansand, and Oslo, Norway; part of Operation Weserübung
 Operation Karlshafen 1940 - German attack against Kristiansand, Norway; part of Operation Weserübung
 Operation Naumburg 1940 - German landing at Narvik, Norway
 Operation Nienburg 1940 - German action at Narvik, Norway; part of Operation Weserübung
 Operation Nord 1940 - German planned invasion of Denmark and Norway; later renamed to Operation Weserübung
 Operation Nordmark 1940 - German attacks on Allied North Sea convoys between Britain and Scandinavia
 Operation Oldenburg 1940 - German attack on Oslo, Norway; part of Operation Weserübung
 Operation Stadthagen 1940 - German attack on Stavanger, Norway; part of Operation Weserübung
 Operation Wildente 1940 - German naval and air operation in Trondheim, Norway
 Operation Altenbeken 1940 - German attack on Åndalsnes, Norway; part of Operation Weserübung
 Operation Altona 1940 - German attack on Arendal, Norway; part of Operation Weserübung
 Operation Biene 1940 - German attack on Alsten Island and Sandnessjøen, Norway; part of Operation Weserübung
 Operation Bremen 1940 - German attack in Norway; part of Operation Weserübung
 Operation Büffel 1940 - German air operation to relieve troops in Narvik, Norway
 Operation Hartmut 1940 - German submarine operations in Norwegian territorial waters
 Fall Rot 1940 - German invasion of France
 Operation Gneisenau 1940 - German diversionary attack on two bridges on the French-German border; part of Fall Grün
 Operation Granit 1940 - German airborne action on Belgian Fort Eben-Emael
 Operation Stahl 1940 - German commando operation to occupy a bridge near Veldwezelt, Belgium
 Operation Tiger 1940 - German offensive on the northern sector of the Maginot Line; part of Fall Rot
 Operation Trojanisches Pferd 1940 - German operation to secure the bridge near Nijmegen in the Netherlands
 Operation Trondheim 1940 - German movement across the Albert Canal against Fort Eben-Emael in Belgium
 Operation Scharnhorst 1940 - German deceptive attack in the Saarbrücken region; part of Fall Grün
 Fall Grün 1940 - German attacks against the Maginot Line on the French-German border in conjunction with Fall Braun
 Fall Gelb 1940 - German invasion of the Low Countries of Belgium, the Netherlands, and Luxembourg
 Operation N 1940 - German airborne operation at Namur, Belgium
 Operation Nebelübung 1940 - German planned invasion of Liège, Belgium; part of Fall Gelb
 Operation Niwi 1940 - German troop deployment in Belgium; part of Fall Gelb
 Operation B 1940 - German attack on the Maginot Line on the German-French border; part of Fall Rot
 Fall Braun 1940 - German attacks against the Maginot Line on the French-German border in conjunction with Fall Grün
 Operation Eisen 1940 - German commando operation to occupy the bridge]over the Albert Canal in Belgium
 Fall Falke 1940 - German attacks against the Maginot Line on the French-German border; part of Fall Grün
 Operation Festung 1940 - German airborne offensive on The Hague, Rotterdam, Dordrecht, and Moerdijk in the Netherlands; part of Fall Gelb
 Operation G 1940 - German airborne offensive on Ghent in the Netherlands; part of Fall Gelb
 Operation Geier 1940 - German attack of the Maginot Line on the French-Germany border north of Kehl, Germany; part of Fall Grün
 Operation Panther (1940) 1940 - German attacks on Strasbourg, France; part of Fall Braun
 Operation Paula 1940 - German aerial bombing of French countryside
 Operation Planspiel III 1940 - German breakthrough of the Maginot Line between Teting and Wittring, France
 Operation Raubvogelkäfig 1940 - German attack on the Maginot Line; part of Fall Grün
 Operation Habicht 1940 - German diversionary attack on Mulhouse, France; part of Fall Grün
 Operation Morgenröte 1940 - German attack on Dutch bridges
 Operation Luchs 1940 - German planned breakthrough between Breisach and Strasbourg, France; part of Fall Grün
 Operation Attila 1940–1942 - German occupation of Vichy France prior to Italian support in 1942
 Operation Hummer 1940–1945 - German infiltration of Britain
 Operation Seemöwe 1940–1945 - German agents infiltration into Britain and Ireland
 Operation Adler 1940 - German attacks on the British Royal Air Force, aimed to soften up the defences for a future amphibious invasion; also known as Operation Adlerangriff
 Operation Alfred 1940 - German mining off Dover, England, using surface minelayers
 Operation Aufbau Ost 1940 - German strategic preparations for Operation Barbarossa
 Operation Bernhard 1940 - German mining off Dover, England
 Operation Felix 1940 - German planned invasion of Gibraltar via the Iberian Peninsula
 Fall Grün 1940 - German plan for a diversionary invasion of Ireland in support of Operation Seelöwe
 Operation Grüne Bewegung 1940 - German planned landing at Brighton, England; part of Operation Seelöwe
 Operation Grünpfeil 1940 - German occupation of the Channel Islands
 Operation Herbstreise 1940 - German planned diversionary invasion of Scotland, Britain; part of Operation Seelöwe
 Operation Hummel 1940 - German intelligence gathering for operation Seelöwe
 Operation Ikarus 1940 - German planned invasion of Iceland in response to British Operation Fork; originally planned to launch in conjunction with Operation Seelöwe
 Operation Kathleen 1940 - German planned invasion of Ireland
 Operation Lichtermeer 1940 - German airfield attacks on British bomber airfields
 Operation Loge 1940 - German 65-day air offensive against London, England
 Operation Lucie 1940 - German planned invasion of the Dutch island of Texel in the North Sea
 Operation Luftparade 1940 - German night raid on British air bases
 Operation Löwe 1940 - German planned invasion of Britain; precursor of Operation Seelöwe
 Operation Marianne 1940 - German motorboat action off Dover, England
 Operation Mondscheinsonate 1940 - German night raid on Coventry, England
 Operation Nord 1940 - German heavy cruiser s raid in the North Atlantic Ocean
 Operation Nordseetour 1940 - German first Atlantic operation of 
 Operation Oldenburg 1940 - German aerial reconnaissance of Soviet Union's natural resources
 Operation Oskar 1940 - German motorboat action off Dover, England, Britain
 Operation Otto 1940 - German strategic preparations for Operation Barbarossa
 Operation Regenschirm 1940 - German aerial bombing of Birmingham, England
 Operation Seelöwe 1940 - German planned invasion of Britain; anglicised as 'Sealion'
 Operation Sonnenblume 1940 - German response to British Operation Compass offensive in North Africa; deployment of the German Afrika Korps in North Africa
 Operation Spark 1940 - German planned assassination of Adolf Hitler and coup d'état against the Nazi German government
 Operation Tannenbaum 1940 - German planned invasion of Switzerland
 Operation Taube 1940 - German mission to transport Irish Republican Army Chief of Staff Seán Russell from Germany to Ireland
 Operation Theodora 1940 - German intelligence gathering operation in North Africa
 Operation Wespennest I 1940 - German destruction of rail links between Switzerland and France
 Operation Wespennest II 1940 - German destruction of rail links between Switzerland and France
 Operation Wikinger 1940 - German sortie by German destroyers into the North Sea
 Operation Wal 1940 - German aborted plan to coordinate actions with Scottish and Welsh nationalist groups
 Operation Walfisch 1940 - German aborted plan to land an agent in Ireland

1941 
 Operation Brandung 1941 - Axis offensive toward El Alamein, Egypt
 Operation Skorpion 1941 - Axis offensive at the Halfaya Pass on the border of Libya and Egypt
 Operation Sommernachtstraum 1941 - Axis attack on British supply depots at Bir Khirreigat, Egypt
 Operation Višegrad 1941 - Axis anti-partisan operation in the Independent State of Croatia
 Operation 25 1941 - German invasion of Yugoslavia
 Operation Castigo 1941 - German aerial bombing of Belgrade, Yugoslavia
 Operation Fritz 1941 - German planned invasion of the Soviet Union; later abandoned in favor of Operation Barbarossa
 Operation Barbarossa 1941 - German invasion of the Soviet Union
 Operation Beowulf I 1941 - German planned offensive of the Baltic States
 Operation Beowulf II 1941 - German offensive in the Baltic States
 Operation Bernhard 1941 - German plan to destabilise British economy with counterfeit British banknotes
 Operation Blaufuchs 1 1941 - German deployment of forces from Germany to northern Finland, part of Operation Silberfuchs
 Operation Blaufuchs 2 1941 - German deployment of German forces from Norway to northern Finland, part of Operation Silberfuchs
 Operation Bogdanow 1941 - German construction operation to build rail bridges between Lida and Molodechno in Belorussia
 Operation Eisstoss 1941 - German air raids against Soviet Baltic Fleet at Kronstadt and Leningrad, USSR
 Operation Fledermaus 1941 - German aerial bombing of British airfields
 Operation Froschlaich 1941 - German air raids against Soviet Navy at Leningrad, USSR; part of Operation Eisstoss
 Operation Götz v. Berlichingen 1941 - German air raids against Soviet Navy at Leningrad, USSR; part of Operation Eissto
 Operation Haifisch I 1941 - German deceptive operation to hint a false invasion of Scotland and England, from Norway before the start of Operation Barbarossa
 Operation Haifisch II 1941 - German deceptive operation to hint a false invasion of Scotland and England, from Norway before the start of Operation Barbarossa
 Operation Hannibal 1941 - German invasion of the island of Lemnos, Greece
 Operation Hannibal 1941 - German operation to take the bridge over the Corinth Canal, near Corinth, Greece
 Operation Harpune 1941 - German deceptive operation to hint a false invasion of southern England, from France before the start of Operation Barbarossa
 Operation Ikarus 1941 - Proposed German invasion of the Kingdom of Iceland
 Operation Irak 1941 - German deployment of aircraft to Iraq
 Operation Isabella 1941 - German planned invasion of the Iberian Peninsula
 Operation Karlsbad 1941 - German anti-partisan operation in the Berezina River region of Belorussia
 Operation Lel 1941 - German diversionary plan in support of operation Beowulf II; part of Operation Nordwind
 Operation Marita 1941 - German invasion of Greece
 Operation Merkur 1941 - German invasion of Crete, Greece
 Operation Mitte 1941 - German attack on the island of Hiiumaa, off Estonian coast; part of Operation Siegfried
 Operation Nau 1941 - German diversionary plan in support of Operation Beowulf II; part of Operation Nordwind
 Operation Nordpol 1941 - German counter-intelligence operation in the Netherlands
 Operation Nordwind 1941 - German diversionary invasion of the island of Saaremaa, Estonia in support of Operation Beowulf II
 Operation Ost 1941 - German attack on Hiiumaa, an island off Estonian coast; part of Operation Siegfried
 Operation Platinfuchs 1941 - German attack towards Murmansk, USSR from Finnish Petsamo, part of Operation Silberfuchs
 Operation Polarfuchs 1941 - German attack towards Kandalaksha, USSR from Finnish Lapland, part of Operation Silberfuchs
 Operation Renate 1941 - German motorboat action off Dover, England
 Operation Renntier 1941 - German occupation of Petsamo; part of Operation Silberfuchs
 Operation Salaam 1941 - German plan to make contact with Egyptian nationalists
 Operation Schlussjagd 1941 - German offensive towards Tula, USSR during the offensive toward Moscow by the 2nd Panzer
 Operation Siegfried 1941 - German attack on Hiiumaa, an island off Estonia; part of Operation Beowulf II
 Operation Silberfuchs 1941 - German attack on Murmansk, USSR; Anglicized as 'Silver Fox'
 Operation Stimmung 1941 - German diversionary plan in support of Operation Beowulf II; part of Operation Nordwind
 Operation Strafe 1941 - German bombing of Belgrade, Yugoslavia; part of Operation 25
 Operation Strafe 1941 - German planned invasion of Bulgaria
 Operation Sturmflut 1941 - German offensive at the Kasserine Pass, Tunisia
 Operation Südwind 1941 - German defence plan against a general uprising in occupied France
 Operation Südwind 1941 - German diversionary attack on the island of Saaremaa, Estonia in support of Operation Beowulf II
 Operation Taifun 1941 - German offensive toward Moscow, USSR; part of Operation Barbarossa
 Operation Taube 1941 - German plan to support the Irish Republican Army in Ireland and Northern Ireland
 Operation Tichwin 1941 - German offensive on Leningrad, USSR
 Operation Venezia 1941 - German advance toward the Gazala Line near Bir Hakeim, Libya
 Operation Weber 1941 - German naval operation off the coast of Southern England
 Operation West 1941 - German attack on Hiiumaa, an island off Estonia; part of Operation Siegfried
 Operation Weststurm 1941 - German naval operation in support of Operation Beowulf II
 Operation Westwind 1941 - German diversionary plan in support of Operation Beowulf II
 Operation Alpenveilchen 1941 - German aborted planned intervention during the Italian invasion of Albania
 Operation Amina 1941 - German failed operation to destroy oil refineries in Abadan, Iran
 Operation Ozren 1941–1942 - German anti-partisan operations near Ozren, Yugoslavia
 Operation Beethoven 1941–1945 - German program to develop composite aircraft

1942 
 Operation Aida 1942 - Axis offensive in Libya with Tobruk as the initial objective in Libya, and advance into Egypt as a strategic goal
 Operation Albia 1942 - Axis anti-partisan operation in the Independent State of Croatia; also known as Operation Alba and Operation Albija
 Operation Alfa 1942 - Axis anti-partisan operation in Yugoslavia
 Operation Beta 1942 - Axis anti-partisan operation in Yugoslavia
 Operation Capri 1942 - Axis counterattack at Medenine, Tunisia
 Operation Edelweiss 1942 - Axis offensive on Caucasus region in southern USSR; part of Operation Braunschweig
 Operation Foca 1942 - Axis anti-partisan operation in the Independent State of Croatia
 Operation Fruška gora 1942 - Axis anti-partisan operation in the Independent State of Croatia
 Operation Jajce 1942 - Axis anti-partisan operation in the Independent State of Croatia
 Operation Jajce II 1942 - Axis anti-partisan operation in the Independent State of Croatia
 Operation Jajce III 1942 - Axis anti-partisan operation in the Independent State of Croatia
 Operation K 1942 - Axis anti-partisan operation in the Independent State of Croatia
 Operation Kasten 1942 - Axis anti-partisan operation in the Independent State of Croatia
 Operation Kozara 1942 - Axis anti-partisan operation in the Independent State of Croatia
 Operation Kreševo 1942 - Axis anti-partisan operation in the Independent State of Croatia
 Operation Lug 1942 - Axis anti-partisan operation in the Independent State of Croatia
 Operation Manjaca Mountains 1942 - Axis anti-partisan operation in the Independent State of Croatia
 Operation Maus 1942 - Axis offensive toward the Caucasus region in Southern USSR
 Operation Petrova gora I 1942 - Axis anti-partisan operation in the Independent State of Croatia
 Operation Petrova gora II 1942 - Axis anti-partisan operation in the Independent State of Croatia
 Operation Prijedor 1942 - Axis anti-partisan operation in the Independent State of Croatia
 Provincia di Lubiana 1942 - Axis anti-partisan operation in the Independent State of Croatia
 Operation S 1942 - Axis anti-partisan operation in the Independent State of Croatia
 Operation Sandmann 1942 - Axis anti-partisan operation in the Independent State of Croatia
 Operation Süd-Kroatien I 1942 - Axis anti-partisan operation in the Independent State of Croatia
 Operation Süd-Kroatien II 1942 - Axis anti-partisan operation in the Independent State of Croatia
 Operation Theseus 1942 - Axis offensive in Cyrenaica, Libya and Egypt
 Operation Travnik 1942 - Axis anti-partisan operation in the Independent State of Croatia
 Operation Trio 1942 - Axis anti-partisan operation in Bosnia and Croatia, Yugoslavia
 Operation Tuzla II 1942 - Axis anti-partisan operation in the Independent State of Croatia
 Operation West-Bosnien 1942 - Axis anti-partisan operation in the Independent State of Croatia
 Operation Zenica-Zavidovici 1942 - Axis anti-partisan operation in the Independent State of Croatia
 Operation Moorbrand 1942 - Cancelled planned attack near Pogostje, USSR
 Operation Sportpalast 1942 - Failed planned naval operation to attack Arctic convoys PQ-12 and QP-8
 Operation Adler 1942 - German anti-partisan operation in Chechivichi region of Belorussia
 Fall Anton 1942 - German occupation of Vichy France with Italian support in 1942
 Operation Attika 1942 - German attack on Tuapse, in the Caucasus region
 Operation Bamberg 1942 - German anti-partisan operation around Bobruisk, Belorussia in conjunction with Operation München I
 Operation Bettelstab 1942 - German planned offensive at Leningrad, USSR
 Fall Blau 1942 - German offensive against Voronezh, USSR
 Operation Blücher 1942 - German attack on the Strait of Kerch in the Caucasus region, and Rzhev, USSR; part of Fall Blau
 Operation Blücher II 1942 - German attack on the Strait of Kerch in the Caucasus region in Souhern USSR; part of Fall Blau
 Operation Braun 1942 - German defence of Tunis, Tunisia in response to Allied operation Torch
 Operation Braunschweig 1942 - German offensive toward Stalingrad and the general Caucasus region in Southern USSR; part of Fall Blau
 Operation Brückenschlag 1942 - German breakout attempt following the Soviet envelopment of German troops in Demyansk, south of Leningrad, USSR
 Operation Bussard 1942 - German offensive in the Caucasus region of Southern USSR
 Operation Cottbus 1942 - German anti-partisan operation in Polotsk, Lepel, and Borisov in Belorussia
 Operation Dampfhamm 1942 - German planned third phase of the German summer offensive in the Caucasus region of Southern USSR
 Operation Derfflinger 1942 - German cancelled pincer operation against Ostashkov, USSR
 Operation Donnerkeil 1942 - German air superiority for Operation Cerberus
 Operation Donnerschlag 1942 - German planned break-out movement from Stalingrad, USSR
 Operation Doppelschlag 1942 - German anti-shipping operation off Novaya Zemlya by Admiral Scheer and Admiral Hipper
 Operation Dora 1942 - German operation to disrupt British supply lines in Southern Libya
 Operation Dreiecke 1942 - German anti-partisan operation in Bryansk, USSR
 Operation Feuerzauber 1942 - German planned attack on Leningrad, USSR; renamed to Operation Nordlicht
 Operation Fischreiher 1942 - German attack on Stalingrad and Astrakhan, USSR; part of Fall Blau
 Operation Fredericus I 1942 - German attack on Kharkov, USSR
 Operation Fredericus II 1942 - German attack on Odessa, Ukraine as a follow-up operation to Operation Fredericus I
 Operation Frieda 1942 - German anti-partisan operation
 Operation Georg 1942 - German planned attack on Leningrad, USSR; renamed to Operation Feuerzauber
 Operation Gertrud 1942 - German planned response in case of Turkey joining the Allies
 Operation Gisella 1942 - German planned invasion of the Iberian peninsula; revised from Operation Isabella
 Operation Greif 1942 - German anti-partisan operation in Orsha and Vitebsk, Belorussia
 Operation Grünspecht 1942 - German anti-partisan operation in Bryansk, USSR
 Operation Hanover I 1942 - German operation near Vyazma, USSR
 Operation Hanover II 1942 - German anti-partisan operation in the Upper Dnieper River region (Byelorussia and Ukraine)
 Operation Hecht 1942 - German first planned submarine wolfpack raid in the North Atlantic Ocean
 Operation Herbstlaub 1942 - German cancelled planned operation in the Caucasus region of Southern USSR, near Krasnoarmeisk, Ukraine and Beketovka, USSR
 Operation Herbstzeitlose 1942 - German cancelled planned plan to advance to the Don and Volga Rivers in the Caucasus region of Southern USSR
 Operation Herkules 1942 - German planned airborne invasion of Malta
 Operation Holzauge 1942 - German activities in Greenland
 Operation Hornbläser 1942 - German planned attack on Alexandria harbour, Egypt
 Operation Ilona 1942 - German planned invasion of the Iberian peninsula; revised from Operation Isabella
 Operation Jacob 1942 - German anti-partisan operation in Uzda, Belorussia
 Operation Klabautermann 1942 - German operation against Soviet supply lines near Leningrad, USSR
 Operation Klette I 1942 - German anti-partisan operation in Bryansk, USSR
 Operation Kreml 1942 - German deceptive operation in support of Operation Edelwei
 Operation Lachsfang 1942 - German combined German and Finnish attack against Kandalaksha and Belomorsk, USSR
 Operation Landbrücke 1942 - German attempt to hold a narrow connection near Demyansk, south of Leningrad, USSR to prevent envelopment
 Operation Lichtschlag 1942 - German cancelled planned attack north of Cholm, USSR near the Lovat and Kunya Rivers
 Operation Lila 1942 - German attempt to capture the French fleet at Toulon, France
 Operation Maikäfer 1942 - German anti-partisan operation in Babruysk, Belorussia
 Operation Malaria 1942 - German anti-partisan operation in Osipovichi, Belorussia
 Operation Mitte Juli 1942 - German anti-partisan operation
 Operation München I 1942 - German anti-partisan operation in Belorussia
 Operation München II 1942 - German anti-partisan operation in Radoshkovichi, Belorussia
 Operation Märzfieber 1942 - German anti-partisan operation in Belorussia
 Operation Möwe I 1942 - German planned operation to sabotage aluminum factories in southern Scotland, Britain
 Operation Neuland 1942 - German submarine operation in the Caribbean
 Operation Nordlicht 1942 - German planned attack on Leningrad, USSR; formerly planned as Operation Feuerzauber
 Operation Nordpol 1942 - German cancelled planned operation east of Moscow, USSR
 Operation Nordsee 1942 - German anti-partisan operation in Mogilev, Belorussia
 Operation Ochsenkopf 1942 - German counterattacks in attempt to expand the Tunis perimeter
 Operation Olymp 1942 - German anti-partisan operation in Greece
 Operation Orkan 1942 - German cancelled planned attack in the Belov–Yukhnov area towards Kaluga in USSR
 Operation Orkan II 1942 - German anti-partisan operation in Lublin, Poland
 General Plan Ost 1942 - German plan for genocide throughout Europe
 Operation Pastorius 1942 - German plan to sabotage industrial targets at Long Island, New York, United States
 Operation Paukenschlag 1942 - German submarine campaign against shipping off the east coast of the United States; nicknamed 'Second Happy Time'
 Operation Polarnacht 1942 - German deployment of battleship  from Wilhelmshaven, Germany, to Trondheim, Norway
 Operation Raubtier 1942 - German attack toward the Volkhov River near Leningrad, USSR, which encircled the 2nd Shock Army.
 Operation Regatta 1942 - German anti-partisan operation in the Smolensk–Gorky area in USSR
 Operation Rösselsprung 1942 - German naval operation to attack Arctic Convoy PQ 17
 Operation Schamil 1942 - German planned operation to secure Caucasus oil fields in Southern USSR using paratroopers
 Operation Schnee 1942 - German supply mission to Norway
 Operation Siegfried 1942 - German attack toward Stalingrad and the general Caucasus region in Southern USSR; part of Fall Blau
 Operation Silberstreife 1942 - German planned operations against Allied convoys to Murmansk, USSR
 Operation Skorpion 1942 - German attack on Halfaya Pass, on the border of Libya and Egypt
 Operation Spätlese 1942 - German anti-partisan operation north of Smolensk, USSR
 Operation Storfang 1942 - German attack on Sevastopol, Ukraine
 Operation Sumpf 1942 - German operation near Demyansk, south of Leningrad, USSR
 Operation Sumpffieber 1942 - German anti-partisan operation in Loknja, Ukraine
 Operation Taubenschlag 1942 - German cancelled planned attack on Toropets, USSR
 Operation Tintenfisch 1942 - German seizure of Swiss exports
 Operation Trappenjagd 1942 - German offensive on the Kerch Peninsula, Ukraine
 Operation Venezie 1942 - German advance against the British Gazala Line toward Tobruk, Libya
 Operation Vierecke 1942 - German anti-partisan operation in Bryansk, USSR
 Operation Vogelsang 1942 - German anti-partisan operation in the Roslavl and Bryansk region of USSR
 Operation Wei 1942 - German anti-partisan operations in Croatia, Yugoslavia
 Operation Wiesengrund 1942 - German unrealised plan for occupation of the Rybachy Peninsula on the USSR's Arctic coast 
 Operation Wilhelm 1942 - German operation against Volchansk, USSR
 Operation Winkelreid 1942 - German operation within the Demyansk Pocket near Leningrad, USSR
 Operation Wintermärchen 1942 - German attack between the Volga and Don Rivers
 Operation Wolke 1942 - German transfer to troops to Norway
 Operation Wunderland 1942 - German anti-shipping operation in Kara Sea and Barents Sea by cruiser 
 Operation Zar 1942 - German minelying operation by the minelayer Ulm.
 Operation Zauberflöte 1942 - German operation to manoeuvre damaged  from Trondheim, Norway to Kiel, Germany
 Operation Zerberus 1942 - German break-out of German capital ships from Brest, France, to Norway; Anglicized as 'Cerberus' and nicknamed by the British as the 'Channel Dash'
 Operation Clausewitz 1942 - German second phase of the German summer offensive in the Caucasus region of Southern USSR

1943 
 Operation Adler 1943 - Axis anti-partisan operation on the north Dalmatian coast in Yugoslavia, with focus in the cities of Rijeka, Karlobag, and Zadar
 Operation Berta 1943 - Axis anti-partisan operation in the Independent State of Croatia
 Operation Bilo gora 1943 - Axis anti-partisan operation in the Independent State of Croatia
 Operation Bilo gora Ost 1943 - Axis anti-partisan operation in the Bilogora Mountains in the Independent State of Croatia
 Operation Cardaci 1943 - Axis anti-partisan operation near Cardaci in the Independent State of Croatia
 Operation Cyrill 1943 - Axis anti-partisan operation at the Glogovnica Canal on the Česma River in the Independent State of Croatia
 Operation Ferkel 1943 - Axis anti-partisan operation in the Majevica mountains northeast of Tuzla in the Independent State of Croatia
 Operation Frühlungswind 1943 - Axis attack on Faid Pass near Sidi Bouzid, Tunisia
 Operation Geiserich 1943 - Axis anti-partisan operation in Split on the coast of the Independent State of Croatia
 Operation Grün 1943 - Axis anti-partisan operation in the Independent State of Croatia
 Operation Grün II 1943 - Axis anti-partisan operation at the Kupa River between the Sava and the Farkašic-Kravarsko line in the Independent State of Croatia
 Operation Gustav 1943 - Axis anti-partisan operation in the Independent State of Croatia
 Operation Ivan 1943 - Axis anti-partisan operation in the Moslavacka Mountains in the Independent State of Croatia
 Operation Klara 1943 - Axis anti-partisan operation in the Velika Kladuša area in the Independent State of Croatia
 Operation Klašnice 1943 - Axis anti-partisan operation in the Independent State of Croatia
 Operation Krause I 1943 - Axis anti-partisan operation in the Independent State of Croatia
 Operation Krause II 1943 - Axis anti-partisan operation in the Independent State of Croatia
 Operation Kugelblitz 1943 - Axis anti-partisan operation in the area between Rogatica and Vlasenica in the Independent State of Croatia
 Operation Merkur 1943 - Axis anti-partisan operation in the Krbavsko Polje plain in the Independent State of Croatia
 Operation Mirko 1943 - Axis anti-partisan operation in the Independent State of Croatia
 Operation Moslavacka gora 1943 - Axis anti-partisan operation in the Independent State of Croatia
 Operation Ostern 1943 - Axis anti-partisan operation in the Independent State of Croatia
 Operation Otto (1943) 1943 - Axis anti-partisan operation in the Grmec Mountains in the Independent State of Croatia
 Operation Ozren 1943 - Axis anti-partisan operation in the Sunja area in the Independent State of Croatia
 Operation Petrinja 1943 - Axis anti-partisan operation at the Okucani-Lipik-Banova Jaruga-Novska area in the Independent State of Croatia
 Operation Pfingsten 1943 - Axis anti-partisan operation in the Prnjavor-Kotor Varoš-Teslic area in the Independent State of Croatia
 Operation Raureif 1943 - Axis anti-partisan operation in Turbe (Travnik) in the Independent State of Croatia
 Operation Richard 1943 - Axis anti-partisan operation near Razboj in the Independent State of Croatia
 Operation Ristow 1943 - Axis anti-partisan operation between Bosanski Novi and Prijedor in the Independent State of Croatia
 Operation Schwarz 1943 - Axis anti-partisan operation in Montenegro and Herzegovina, Yugoslavia
 Operation Tannenbaum 1943 - Axis anti-partisan operation in the area between Bosanski Novi and Buzim in the Independent State of Croatia
 Operation Teslic I 1943 - Axis anti-partisan operation in the Independent State of Croatia
 Operation Ulrich 1943 - Axis anti-partisan operation in the Kozara Mountains in the Independent State of Croatia
 Operation Una-Sava Bend 1943 - Axis anti-partisan operation in the Independent State of Croatia
 Operation Varaždin 1943 - Axis anti-partisan operation in the Kalnik Mountains between Varaždin and Križevci in the Independent State of Croatia
 Operation Virovitica 1943 - Axis anti-partisan operation in the Independent State of Croatia
 Operation Windstoss 1943 - Axis anti-partisan operation in the Independent State of Croatia
 Operation Zagorje 1943 - Axis anti-partisan operation in the Kalnik Mountains in the Novi Marof area in the Independent State of Croatia
 Operation 505 1943 - German anti-partisan operation in Tuzla, Bosnia, Yugoslavia
 Fall Achse 1943 - German response to Italian surrender to the Allies
 Operation Arnim 1943 - German anti-partisan operation in the Fruška gora Mountains in Syrmia in the Independent State of Croatia
 Operation Attacke 1943 - German mine laying operation north of Corsica, France
 Operation Ausladung 1943 - German offensive near Tunis, Tunisia in conjunction with Operation Ochsenkopf
 Operation Braun 1943 - German anti-partisan operation in Yugoslavia
 Operation Brunhild 1943 - German planned evacuation from the Caucasus region in Southern USSR
 Operation Burdock 1943 - German anti-partisan operation in USSR
 Operation Büffel-Bewegung 1943 - German evacuation of Rzhev, USSR
 Operation Cannae 1943 - German occupation of Zagreb, Sisak, and Bjelovar in Yugoslavia
 Operation Delphin 1943 - German anti-partisan operation in the Dalmatian islands in Adriatic Sea
 Operation Delphin 1943 - German withdrawal from Saaremaa, Estonia
 Operation Delta 1943 - German anti-partisan operation in Western Greece
 Operation Donnerkeil 1943 - German anti-partisan operation in Yugoslavia
 Operation Donnerschlag 1943 - German anti-partisan operation along the Obdol River in USSR
 Operation Draufgänger 1943 - German anti-partisan operation in USSR
 Operation Eiche 1943 - German operation to rescue Benito Mussolini from Allied imprisonment
 Operation Eilbote I 1943 - German attacks on Allied positions at the Dorsal Mountains in Tunisia
 Operation Eilbote II 1943 - German cancelled planned attacks on Allied positions at the Dorsal Mountains in Tunisia following Operation Eilbote I
 Operation Eisb 1943 - German anti-partisan operation in Bryansk, USSR
 Operation Eisbär 1943 - German invasion of Kos, Greece
 Operation Eisenhammer 1943 - German planned aerial bombing operation against power generators in Moscow and Gorky, USSR
 Operation Eisfjord 1943 - German naval bombardment of Spitsbergen, Svalbard, Norway
 Operation Erntefest I 1943 - German anti-partisan operation west of Ossipovichi, USSR
 Operation Erntefest II 1943 - German anti-partisan operation near Minsk and Slutsk, Belorussia
 Operation Ferdinand 1943 - German anti-partisan operation in the Fruška gora Mountains in Syrmia in the Independent State of Croatia
 Operation Ferkel 1943 - German anti-partisan operation in Bryansk, USSR
 Operation Feuerstein 1943 - German defensive build-up of the Italian Alpine passes
 Operation Fliederblüte 1943 - German attack of British units at the "Banana Ridge" in Tunisia
 Operation Franz 1943 - German commando operation against British supply lines in Iran
 Operation Freischütz 1943 - German anti-partisan operation
 Operation Fronttheater 1943 - German first aborted German Arctic sortie by Scharnhorst, Prinz Eugen, and destroyers
 Operation Gamma 1943 - German anti-partisan operation in Yugoslavia
 Operation Gesellenprüfung 1943 - German mine laying operation via S-Boats
 Operation Günther 1943 - German anti-partisan operation in Smolensk, USSR prior to Operation Zitadelle
 Operation Habicht 1943 - German anti-partisan operation
 Operation Hagen 1943 - German operation in the Caucasus region of Southern USSR
 Operation Hagen Bewegung 1943 - German evacuation operation near Oryol, USSR
 Operation Haifisch 1943 - German anti-partisan operation in Trogir in Croatia, Yugoslavia
 Operation Hamburg 1943 - German anti-partisan operation in Bryansk, USSR
 Operation Hasenjagd 1943 - German anti-partisan operation in Gomel, Belorussia
 Operation Herbstgewitter I 1943 - German anti-partisan operation at Pelješac peninsula, Independent State of Croatia
 Operation Herbstgewitter II 1943 - German anti-partisan operation at Peljesac peninsula, Independent State of Croatia
 Operation Herbstgewitter III 1943 - German anti-partisan operations at the islands of Mljet, Hvar, Brac, and Solta off the coast of Independent State of Croatia  
 Operation Herbstgewitter IV 1943 - German anti-partisan operations at the islands of Mljet, Hvar, Brac, and Solta off the coast of Independent State of Croatia 
 Operation Hermann 1943 - German anti-partisan operation in Vilnius and Polotsk, Belorussia
 Operation Hermelin 1943 - German cruiser Lützow operation in the Baltic Sea
 Operation Hornung 1943 - German anti-partisan operation
 Operation Hubertus 1943 - German anti-partisan operation in Pindus Mountains region of Greece
 Operation Husar 1943 - German cancelled planned anti-shipping operation in Kara Sea by Lützow
 Operation Insel 1943 - German action at Hydra Island, Greece
 Operation Istrien 1943 - German anti-partisan operation in Northern Italy
 Operation Karin 1943 - German deployment of naval vessels in the English Channel
 Operation Kiebitz 1943 - German POW rescue operation via submarine navigation of the St. Lawrence River in Canada
 Operation Konstantin 1943 - German seizure of Italian equipment and territory upon the Italian surrender
 Operation Kopenhagen 1943 - German defensive build-up of the French and Italian Alpine passes
 Operation Kormoran 1943 - German anti-partisan operation in Minsk and Borisov, Belorussia
 Operation Krimhilde Bewegung 1943 - German evacuation of the Caucasus region in Southern USSR
 Operation Kuckucksei 1943 - German cancelled planned attack on British units at the Fondouk Pass, Tunisia
 Operation Kugelblitz 1943 - German anti-partisan operation near Vitebsk, Belarus
 Operation Landsturm 1943 - German anti-partisan operation in Makarska, Independent State of Croatia
 Operation Leander 1943 - German anti-partisan operation across the Lika Mountains to Zadar on the coast of the Independent State of Croatia after
 Operation Lehrgang 1943 - German evacuation of Sicily, Italy, over the Strait of Messina
 Operation Leopard 1943 - German landings on Leros of the Dodecanese Islands, Greece
 Operation Lika 1943 - German planned anti-partisan operation against Josip Broz Tito in Yugoslavia
 Operation Maigewitter 1943 - German anti-partisan operation
 Operation Michael 1943 - German cancelled planned evacuation of Crimea
 Operation Morgenluft 1943 - German attack on Gafsa, Tunisia
 Operation Nachbarhilfe I 1943 - German anti-partisan operation in Bryansk, USSR
 Operation Nachbarhilfe I 1943 - German anti-partisan operation in Mglin, USSR
 Operation Nelly U 1943 - German towing of a 3,000-ton drydock from Mariupol to Odessa, Ukraine
 Operation Neptun 1943 - German counter-offensive at Myschanko-Berg during the Battle of Stalingrad
 Operation Nürnberg 1943 - German planned response in case of an Allied invasion of the Iberian Peninsula, focusing largely around the defence of the Pyrenees passes
 Operation Olivenernte 1943 - German cancelled planned attack on Majaz al Bab, Tunisia
 Operation Orange 1943 - German convoy off Temryuk, Southern USSR in the Sea of Azov
 Operation Panther (1943, Yugoslavia) 1943 - German anti-partisan operation at Mesovan Pass in Southeastern Croatia, Yugoslavia
 Operation Panther (1943, Greece) 1943 - German anti-partisan operation in Greece
 Operation Panther (1943, USSR) 1943 - German anti-partisan operation near Kursk, USSR after Operation Zitadelle
 Operation Panzerfaust 1943 - German operation to kidnap Miklós Horthy's son to prevent Horthy from siding with the Allies; codename later changed to Maus
 Operation Parnass 1943 - German anti-partisan operation in Lamia, Greece
 Operation Paula 1943 - German anti-partisan operation north of the Sava River in Serbia
 Operation Poseidon 1943 - German operation against British troops on the Greek island of Samos; part of Operation Zwischenspiel
 Operation Puma 1943 - German anti-partisan operation in Greece
 Operation Rabat 1943 - German plan to kidnap the Pope from the Vatican City
 Operation Regatta I 1943 - German artillery bombardment of the Strait of Kerch between the Black Sea and the Sea of Azov
 Operation Reinhard 1943 - German systematic murder of Polish intelligentia; phase I of the German 'Final Solution'
 Operation Safari 1943 - German SS operation to disband the Danish military
 Operation Schneesturm 1943 - German anti-partisan operation in Bosnia, Independent State of Croatia
 Operation Schnepfe 1943 - German anti-partisan operation north of Vitebsk, Belorussia in conjunction with Operation Wildente
 Operation Schwarz 1943 - German plan in the event of an Italian surrender
 Operation Seehund 1943 - German submarine mining operation
 Operation Seeräuber 1943 - German failed landing on the island of Brac off the coast of Independent State of Croatia
 Operation Siegfried 1943 - German plan to deploy Italian units to Southern France after Italian surrender
 Operation Sizilien 1943 - German raid on Allied occupied Spitsbergen, Svalbard, Norway
 Operation Theodor 1943 - German convoy off Temryuk, Southern USSR in the Sea of Azov
 Operation Tiger 1943 - German anti-partisan operation in Greece
 Operation Toni 1943 - German convoy off Temryuk, Southern USSR in the Sea of Azov
 Operation Trave 1943 - German escort operations for blockade runners
 Operation Ulm 1943 - German planned aerial bombing operation against Soviet industries in the Ural Mountains
 Operation Ursula 1943 - German anti-partisan operation in Rogachev, Belorussia
 Operation Waldwinter 1943 - German anti-partisan operation north of Vitebsk, Belorussia
 Operation Weihnachtsmann 1943 - German anti-partisan operation in the Balkans
 Operation Weiß I 1943 - German anti-partisan operation in Sarajevo, Independent State of Croatia
 Operation Weiß II 1943 - German anti-partisan operation in Sarajevo, Independent State of Croatia; continuation of Operation Weiß I
 Operation Wiking 1943 - German operations in the Caucasus region of Southern USSR
 Operation Wildente 1943 - German anti-partisan operation north of Vitebsk, Belorussia in conjunction with Operation Schnepfe
 Operation Wildsau 1943 - German anti-partisan operation in USSR
 Operation Wildsau 1943 - German anti-partisan operation in Tuzla, Independent State of Croatia
 Operation Winterzauber 1943 - German anti-partisan operation in Lithuania
 Operation Wolkenbruch 1943 - German failed anti-partisan operation in Northern Yugoslavia
 Operation Wulf 1943 - German anti-partisan operation in Kordun, Bosnia, Banovina and Turopolje, Independent State of Croatia
 Operation Wunderland II 1943 - German planned naval operation involving cruiser Admiral Scheer in the East Siberian Sea
 Operation Yarmouth 1943 - German artillery bombardment of Yeysk, USSR
 Operation Ziethen 1943 - German anti-partisan operation in Livno, Bosnia, Yugoslavia
 Operation Ziethen 1943 - German planned evacuation from the Demyansk Pocket near Leningrad, USSR
 Operation Zigeunerbaron 1943 - German anti-partisan operation in Bryansk, USSR
 Operation Zitadelle 1943 - German offensive at Kursk, USSR
 Operation Zitronella 1943 - German raid against a Norwegian/British station at the Svalbard Islands
 Operation Zwischenspiel 1943 - German attack on the Greek island of Samos; part of Operation Leopard
 Operation Ostfront 1943 - German final German operation of Scharnhorst to intercept Convoy JW 55B
 Operation Paderborn 1943 - German third and successful German transfer of Scharnhorst and destroyers from the Baltic Sea to Narvik, Norway

1944 
 Operation Arras 1944 - Axis anti-partisan operation in the Lipik–Novska–Okučani region in the Independent State of Croatia
 Operation Bergwiese 1944 - Axis anti-partisan operation on the Primošten Peninsula in the Independent State of Croatia
 Operation Bienenhaus 1944 - Axis anti-partisan operation in the Moslavina Mountains in the Independent State of Croatia
 Operation Blitz 1944 - Axis anti-partisan operation in the Našice–Đakovo region of Slavonia, Yugoslavia
 Operation Brandfackel 1944 - Axis anti-partisan operation in the Kozara Mountains in the Independent State of Croatia
 Operation Cannae 1944 - Axis anti-partisan operation in the area between the Sava and Drava Rivers in the Independent State of Croatia
 Operation Casanova 1944 - Axis anti-partisan operation in the Independent State of Croatia utilizing German aircraft to deceive partisan fighters
 Operation Dreznica 1944 - Axis anti-partisan operation in the Velika Kapela Mountains in the Independent State of Croatia to secure a supply route
 Operation Dubrovnik 1944 - Axis anti-partisan operation along the road between Zagreb and Varaždin in the Independent State of Croatia
 Operation Dubrovnik II 1944 - Axis anti-partisan operation along the road between Zagreb and Varaždin in the Independent State of Croatia; continuation of Operation Dubrovnik
 Operation Dünkirchen I 1944 - Axis anti-partisan operation in the Krašić region in the Independent State of Croatia
 Operation Dünkirchen II 1944 - Axis anti-partisan operation in the Krašić region in the Independent State of Croatia; continuation of Operation Dünkirchen I
 Operation Emil 1944 - Axis anti-partisan operation west of Knin in the Independent State of Croatia
 Operation Falke 1944 - Axis anti-partisan operation in the Papuk Mountain and Bilogora Mountains in the Independent State of Croatia
 Operation Frühlingswetter 1944 - Axis anti-partisan operation in the area between Knin and Kistanje in the Independent State of Croatia to secure a supply route
 Operation Fuchsjagd 1944 - Axis anti-partisan operation in the Ivanščica Mountains in the Independent State of Croatia
 Operation Fuchsjagd III 1944 - Axis anti-partisan operation in the Kalnik Mountains in the Independent State of Croatia
 Operation Föhn 1944 - Axis anti-partisan operation west of Banja Luka to open the road between Bosanski Novi and Prijedor in the Independent State of Croatia
 Operation Ingeborg 1944 - Axis anti-partisan operation east of Karlovac and north of the Kupa River in the Independent State of Croatia
 Operation Jajce 1944 - Axis anti-partisan operation in the Vrbas Valley in the Independent State of Croatia
 Operation Kastanie 1944 - Axis anti-partisan operation in the Prijedor–Sanski Most–Omarska area in the Independent State of Croatia
 Operation Kaub 1944 - Axis anti-partisan operation at the Sava River in the Independent State of Croatia, destroying all boats and ferries
 Operation Kornblume 1944 - Axis anti-partisan operation in the Fruška gora Mountains in the Independent State of Croatia
 Operation Lauffeuer 1944 - Axis anti-partisan operation in the area south of Šid and near Ilok in Syrmia in the Independent State of Croatia
 Operation Morgenstern 1944 - Axis anti-partisan operation in the Krbavsko Polje plain in the Independent State of Croatia
 Operation Nibelungenfahrt 1944 - Axis anti-partisan operation in the Krbavsko Polje plain in the Independent State of Croatia
 Operation Reinhard 1944 - Axis occupation of ore mines in and around Ljubija in the Independent State of Croatia
 Operation Renate 1944 - Axis anti-partisan operation on the Murter Peninsula in the Independent State of Croatia
 Operation Rouen 1944 - Axis anti-partisan operation at the Kalnik Mountains south of the Ludbreg–Koprivnica Line in the Independent State of Croatia
 Operation Sarajevo 1944 - Axis anti-partisan operation west of the Sesvete–Varaždin road in the Independent State of Croatia
 Operation Schach 1944 - Axis anti-partisan operation in the Kordun and Banija regions in the Independent State of Croatia
 Operation Schlüsselblume 1944 - Axis anti-partisan operation in western Slavonia in the Independent State of Croatia
 Operation Schneeschmelze 1944 - Axis anti-partisan operation in the Zaprešić–Krapinske Toplice–Klanjec area in the Independent State of Croatia
 Operation Steinschlag 1944 - Axis anti-partisan operation near Otočac and Vrhovine in the Independent State of Croatia
 Operation Trolist 1944 - Axis anti-partisan operation in the Zaistovec–Preseka region in the Independent State of Croatia
 Operation Ungewitter 1944 - Axis anti-partisan operation in the Papuk Mountains in the Independent State of Croatia
 Operation Wildsau 1944 - Axis anti-partisan operation west of the railroad connecting Đurmanec and Krapinske Toplice in the Independent State of Croatia
 Operation Wintergewitter 1944 - Axis attack on the US Army in the Apennine mountains, Italy
 Operation Zumberak IV 1944 - Axis anti-partisan operation in the Plesivica Mountains in the Independent State of Croatia
 Operation Antimon 1944 - German operations in Romania
 Operation Aster 1944 - German evacuation of Estonia
 Operation Birke 1944 - German plan to withdraw from northern Finland prior to the Lapland War
 Operation Blei 1944 - German operations in Romania
 Fall Blume I 1944 - German defence plan in case of an Allied invasion of Northern France
 Fall Blume II 1944 - German defence plan in case of an Allied invasion of Southern France
 Operation Braunschweig 1944 - German anti-partisan operation in the Istria Peninsula, OZAK
 Operation Christrose 1944 - German early name for Wacht am Rhein
 Operation Doppelkopf 1944 - German offensive to relieve]troops fighting in Latvia
 Operation Doppelsprung 1944 - German planned evacuation of bridgeheads at the river Maas (Meuse) west of Arnhem, the Netherlands
 Operation Draufgänger 1944 - German anti-partisan operation in Montenegro, Yugoslavia and in Northern Albania
 Operation Einhorn 1944 - German anti-partisan operation in Greece
 Operation Elster 1944 - German infiltration of agents into the US to gather intelligence on Manhattan Project
 Operation Ernteeinbringung 1944 - German anti-partisan operation east of Zagreb, Independent State of Croatia
 Fall Falke 1944 - German defence plan in case of an Allied invasion of Norway
 Operation Feuerwehr 1944 - German failed planned anti-partisan operation in Macedonia, Yugoslavia
 Operation Feuerzange 1944 - German anti-partisan operation in the Dalmatian islands in Adriatic Sea
 Operation Feuerzauber 1944 - German destruction of bridges near Florence, Italy
 Operation Fischfang 1944 - German counterattack to the Allied invasion at Anzio, Italy
 Operation Fliegenfänger 1944 - German anti-partisan operation in Memici and Osmaci in Bosnia, Yugoslavia
 Operation Forelle 1944 - German operation to disrupt Soviet supply lines on the Danube River near Budapest, Hungary
 Fall Forelle I 1944 - German defence plan in case of an Allied invasion of the Balkans via the Adriatic Sea
 Fall Forelle II 1944 - German defence plan in case of an Allied invasion of the Balkans via the Aegean Sea
 Operation Freischütz 1944 - German cancelled planned operation to occupy the island of Vis off Croatia, Yugoslavia
 Operation Freischütz 1944 - German relief operation for troops trapped near Minsk, Belorussia
 Operation Frühling 1944 - German anti-partisan operation in the Jura Mountains in Southern France
 Operation Frühlingsanfang 1944 - German anti-partisan operation at Primorska and Gorenjska in Slovenia, Yugoslavia
 Operation Frühlingsfest 1944 - German anti-partisan operation in Lepel, Belorussia as a follow-up operation of Operation Regenschauer
 Operation Gemsbock 1944 - German anti-partisan operation in the region near the Greek-Albanian border before Operation Einhorn
 Operation Greif 1944 - German infiltration of Allied rear areas using Allied uniforms; part of Wacht am Rhein
 Operation Großer Schlag 1944 - German planned mass-deployment of fighters against Allied bombers
 Fall Hanna 1944 - German defence plan in case of an Allied invasion of Denmark
 Operation Haudegen 1944 - German intelligence gathering on Spitsbergen, Norway
 Operation Heide 1944 - German flooding of parts of the Netherlands to hinder Allied advance; later renamed to Operation Storch
 Operation Heinrich 1944 - German deceptive operation in support of Wacht am Rhein
 Operation Herbstnebel 1944 - German rejected plan to withdraw German troops in Italy behind the Po River
 Operation Heu-Aktion 1944 - German enslavement of Eastern European children between the age of 10 and 15 to work in the German armament industry
 Operation Hinein 1944 - German submarine operation against an Allied convoy in the North Atlantic Ocean
 Operation Hohes Venn 1944 - German paratrooper operation as a part of Operation Greif of Wacht am Rhein
 Operation Horrido 1944 - German anti-partisan operation in Thessaloniki, Greece
 Operation Hundesohn 1944 - German occupation of Sofia, Bulgaria
 Operation Ibex 1944 - German air raids on London and other nearby British cities
 Operation Iltis 1944 - German anti-partisan operation in Thessaloniki, Greece
 Operation Judas 1944 - German anti-partisan operation in Bulgaria
 Kampf um Rom 1944 - German defence plan for the Nettuno area in Italy
 Operation Koralle 1944 - German anti-partisan operation in the Sporades Islands, Greece; previously named Operation Neptun
 Operation Kreuzotter 1944 - German anti-partisan operation in Greece
 Operation Landwirt 1944 - German submarine operation against the Allied fleet off France during the Normandy invasion
 Operation Laura 1944 - German proposed planned evacuation of Courland, Latvia
 Operation Ludwig 1944 - German plan against an Allied landing at Livorno, Italy
 Operation Lüttich 1944 - German counter-offensive at Mortain, France, in response to Operation Cobra
 Operation Maibaum 1944 - German anti-partisan operation in Vlasenica in Bosnia, Yugoslavia
 Operation Maigewitter 1944 - German anti-partisan operation in Northern Greece
 Fall Marder 1944 - German defence plan in case of an Allied invasion of Italy; activated after Allies launched Operation Shingle
 Fall Marder I 1944 - German defence plan in case of an Allied invasion of Italy via the Ligurian Sea; part of Fall Marder
 Fall Marder II 1944 - German defence plan in case of an Allied invasion of Italy via the Adriatic Sea; part of Fall Marder
 Operation Margarethe I 1944 - German occupation of Hungary
 Operation Margarethe II 1944 - German occupation of Romania
 Operation Martin 1944 - German planned attack of the Ardennes region as proposed by Gerd von Rundstedt; rejected by Adolf Hitler for being too conservative
 Operation Messer 1944 - German mining of the Ligurian Sea off Northern Italy
 Operation Morgenröte 1944 - German counterattack to the Allied invasion at Anzio and Nettuno, Italy
 Operation Morgenwind I 1944 - German landing on the island of Brač off the coast of Croatia, Yugoslavia
 Operation Morgenwind II 1944 - German landing on the island of Šolta off the coast of Croatia, Yugoslavia
 Operation München 1944 - German fallback to the Arno River in the Tuscany region of Italy
 Operation Möwe V 1944 - German cancelled plan to land agents in Scotland, Britain
 Operation Napfkuchen 1944 - German anti-partisan operation in Yugoslavia
 Operation Neptun 1944 - German anti-partisan operation in the Sporades Islands, Greece; later renamed to Operation Koralle
 Operation Nordlicht 1944 - German withdrawal from the Kola Peninsula into Norway after Finland changed sides in the war
 Operation Nordlicht-Bewegung 1944 - German troop deployment in Finland
 Operation Nussknacker 1944 - German torpedo boat operation off Corsica, France
 Operation Odysseus 1944 - German naval deployment in the Adriatic Sea and Aegean Sea
 Operation Panzerfaust 1944 - German occupation of Hungary
 Operation Pfingstausflug 1944 - German anti-partisan operation in Polotsk and Lepel, Belorussia
 Operation Prüfstand XII 1944 - German program to develop submarine-launched V-2 rockets
 Operation Regenschauer 1944 - German anti-partisan operation in Lepel and Polotsk in Belorussia
 Operation Rentier 1944 - German anti-partisan operation in Greece
 Operation Richard 1944 - German defence plan in case of an Allied invasion of Italy; activated after Allies launched Operation Shingle
 Operation Rumpelkammer 1944 - German start of the V-1 rocket attacks against London
 Operation Rübezahl 1944 - German anti-partisan operation in Montenegro, Yugoslavia
 Operation Röslein 1944 - German anti-partisan operation in Macedonia, Yugoslavia
 Operation Rösselsprung 1944 - German attempt to capture Josip Broz Tito
 Operation Schneegestöber 1944 - German operation to find and capture Josip Broz Tito's headquarters in Yugoslavia
 Operation Sonnenaufgang 1944 - German attack on Allied units at Anzio, Italy
 Operation Steinadler 1944 - German anti-partisan operation in Eastern Greece
 Operation Steinbock 1944 - German bombing of London and Southern England, Britain
 Operation Storch 1944 - German flooding of parts of the Netherlands to hinder Allied advance; previously named Operation Heide
 Operation Student 1944 - German plan to restore Benito Mussolini's power in Italy
 Operation Stösser 1944 - German airborne drop behind Allied lines; part of Wacht am Rhein
 Operation Süd 1944 - German deceptive operation at Nettuno, Italy
 Operation Tanne Ost 1944 - German attack on the island of Hogland in the Baltic Sea from Finland
 Operation Tanne West 1944 - German planned invasion of Åland in the Baltic Sea from Finland
 Operation Treibjagd 1944 - German anti-partisan operation in Yugoslavia
 Operation Treuebruch 1944 - German occupation of the Bulgarian-held Skopje region of Macedonia, Yugoslavia
 Operation Trojanisches Pferd 1944 - German occupation of Budapest, Hungary; part of Operation Margarethe I
 Operation Uljan 1944 - German anti-partisan operation on the island of Ugljan off the coast of the Independent State of Croatia
 Operation Verrat 1944 - German attack on forces of Dragoljub Mihailovic in Yugoslavia
 Operation Verrat 1944 - German attack on forces of Napoleon Zervas in Greece
 Wacht am Rhein 1944 - German offensive in the Ardennes; Anglicized as 'Watch on the Rhine'
 Operation Waldrausch 1944 - German anti-partisan operation in the Balkans
 Operation Walküre 1944 - German attempt to overthrow Adolf Hitler, written under the cover of a plan to foil potential worker rebellions; Anglicized as 'Valkyre'
 Operation Walzertraum 1944 - German landing on the island of Hvar off the coast of Croatia, Yugoslavia; part of Operation Herbstgewitter III and Operation Herbstgewitter IV
 Operation Weststurm 1944 - German naval bombardment of Sworbe, Estonia
 Operation Wikinger 1944 - German offensive on the islands off the Dalmatian coast of Yugoslavia
 Operation Winterende 1944 - German anti-partisan operation in Slovenia, Yugoslavia; part of Operation Frühlingsanfang
 Operation Wintermärchen 1944 - German offensive on American troops in Italy
 Operation Wulf 1944 - German anti-partisan operation in Thessaloniki, Greece
 Operation Zeppelin 1944 - German failed operation to destroy power plants in Moscow, USSR

1945 
 Operation Bergwind 1945 - Axis anti-partisan operation at the Moslavacka Mountains southeast of Zagreb in the Independent State of Croatia
 Operation Frühlingssturm 1945 - Axis anti-partisan operation along the Danube River in the Independent State of Croatia
 Operation Konrad 1945 - Axis attack near Budapest, Hungary to relieve the surrounded city
 Operation Lawine 1945 - Axis anti-partisan operation in the Lašva Valley and Travnik the Independent State of Croatia
 Operation Caesar 1945 - Failed transfer of technical design plans and strategic materials from Germany to Japan, using submarine U-864
 Operation Aktion 24 1945 - German aborted planned suicide aerial attack on bridges over the Vistula river in attempt to disrupt Soviet supply lines
 Operation Alpenfestung 1945 - German plan for a redoubt in the German Alps
 Operation Birkhahn 1945 - German evacuation of Norway
 Operation Bodenplatte 1945 - German air raid against Allied airbases in the Netherlands and Belgium in support of Wacht am Rhein
 Operation Clausewitz 1945 - German defense plan for the city of Berlin.
 Operation Freiheit 1945 - German destruction of a bridge on the Oder River
 Operation Frühlingserwachen 1945 - German counter-offensive against Soviet troops near Budapest, Hungary
 Operation Gertraud 1945 - German planned aerial bombing of hydropower plants east of Moscow, USSR
 Operation Hannibal 1945 - German evacuation of East Prussia, Germany
 Operation Hermann 1945 - German attack on British air units in Belgium and the Netherlands
 Operation Maigewitter 1945 - German anti-partisan operation in Tuzla in Bosnia, Yugoslavia
 Operation Nordwind 1945 - German offensive in Alsace and Lorraine in north-eastern France in conjunction with Wacht am Rhein
 Operation Regenbogen 1945 - German rescinded planned order to scuttle German ships at the end of the war
 Operation Regenwurm 1945 - German plan to move V-2 rockets to avoid Allied air strikes
 Operation Schneeman 1945 - German offensive in the Netherlands in conjunction with Wacht am Rhein
 Operation Sonnenwende 1945 - German attack of Soviet troops in Choszczno, Pomerania, Germany
 Operation Südwind 1945 - German counter-offensive from Esztergom, Hungary
 Operation Waldteufel 1945 - German anti-partisan operation in Budapest, Hungary
 Operation Werewolf 1945 - German anti-partisan operation in Croatia, Yugoslavia
 Operation Werewolf 1945 - German fighter deployment against Allied bombing
 Operation Zahnarzt 1945 - German operation in the area of Molsheim, France, and Zabern, Germany

References

Military operations of World War II
Military history of Germany during World War II